Ousmane Thomas Diagne is a French professional mixed martial artist currently competing in the Lightweight division. A professional competitor since 2009, he has formerly competed for Bellator, Strikeforce, and Tachi Palace Fights.

Background
Diagne, who is from France, is a longtime practitioner of Sanshou, a Chinese form of kickboxing, and has won six titles in the sport. Diagne transitioned into mixed martial arts, under the tutelage of Cung Le.

Mixed martial arts career

Strikeforce
Diagne made his professional mixed martial arts debut on May 15, 2009 at Strikeforce Challengers: Evangelista vs. Aina against Kaleo Kwan. Diagne won via unanimous decision.

He made his next appearance on November 6, 2009 at Strikeforce Challengers: Gurgel vs. Evangelista against Merritt Warren. Diagne lost via submission in the first round.

Diagne then fought at Strikeforce Challengers: del Rosario vs. Mahe on July 23, 2010, facing off against Caros Fodor and lost via unanimous decision.

At Strikeforce Challengers: Beerbohm vs. Healy on February 18, 2011, Diagne fought Aaron Franco and lost via knockout in the first round.

Independent promotions
Diagne left Strikeforce with a 1-3 record, and proceeded to go on a four-fight winning streak, before losing his last fight to Brandon Ricetti on June 28, 2014, via rear-naked choke.

Mixed martial arts record

|-
| Loss
| align=center| 6–8–1
| Fabricio Guerreiro 
| TKO (punches)
| URCC 32: Fury
| 
| align=center| 3
| align=center| 2:51
| Lincoln, California, United States
|For URCC Lightweight Championship.
|-
| Loss
| align=center| 6–7–1
| Te'Jovan Edwards
| TKO (head kick and punches)
| Tachi Palace Fights 32
| 
| align=center| 1
| align=center| 2:27
| Leemore, California, United States
|
|-
| Win
| align=center| 6–6–1
| Antonio Roberto
| Decision (unanimous)
| Conquer FC 3
| 
| align=center| 3
| align=center| 5:00
| Richmond, California, United States
|
|-
| Loss
| align=center| 5–6–1
| Mark Dickman
| TKO (punches)
| Bellator 154
| 
| align=center| 3
| align=center| 3:05
| San Jose, California, United States
|
|-
| Loss
| align=center| 5–5–1
| Erick Sanchez
| TKO (punches)
| Bellator 147
| 
| align=center| 3
| align=center| 1:22
| San Jose, California, United States
|
|-
| Draw
| align=center| 5–4–1
| Mike Malott
| Draw (majority)
| Bellator MMA & Glory: Dynamite 1
| 
| align=center| 3
| align=center| 5:00
| San Jose, California, United States
| 
|-
| Loss
| align=center| 5–4
| Brandon Ricetti
| Submission (rear-naked choke)
| WFC 10: Diagne vs. Ricetti
| 
| align=center| 2
| align=center| 1:10
| Sacramento, California, United States
| 
|-
| Win
| align=center| 5–3
| Dominic Clark
| KO (head kick)
| WFC 9: Mitchell vs. Jara
| 
| align=center| 1
| align=center| 2:00
| Sacramento, California, United States
| 
|-
| Win
| align=center| 4–3
| Brad McDonald
| TKO (doctor stoppage)
| TWC 17: Conflict
| 
| align=center| 1
| align=center| 5:00
| Porterville, California, United States
| 
|-
| Win
| align=center| 3–3
| David Douglas
| KO (punch)
| Red Canvas: Art of Submission 3
| 
| align=center| 1
| align=center| 3:03
| Stockton, California, United States
| 
|-
| Win
| align=center| 2–3
| Alexander Trevino
| TKO (kick to the body)
| Red Canvas: Art of Submission 1
| 
| align=center| 3
| align=center| 3:39
| San Jose, California, United States
| 
|-
| Loss
| align=center| 1–3
| Aaron Franco
| KO (punches)
| Strikeforce Challengers: Beerbohm vs. Healy
| 
| align=center| 1
| align=center| 4:22
| Cedar Park, Texas, United States
| 
|-
| Loss
| align=center| 1–2
| Caros Fodor
| Decision (unanimous)
| Strikeforce Challengers: del Rosario vs. Mahe
| 
| align=center| 3
| align=center| 5:00
| Everett, Washington, United States
| 
|-
| Loss
| align=center| 1–1
| Merritt Warren
| Submission (inverted heel hook)
| Strikeforce Challengers: Gurgel vs. Evangelista
| 
| align=center| 1
| align=center| 3:49
| Fresno, California, United States
| 
|-
| Win
| align=center| 1–0
| Kaleo Kwan
| Decision (unanimous)
| Strikeforce Challengers: Evangelista vs. Aina
| 
| align=center| 3
| align=center| 5:00
| Fresno, California, United States
|

References

External links
 

Living people
French male mixed martial artists
French mixed martial artists of Black African descent
Lightweight mixed martial artists
Mixed martial artists utilizing sanshou
French sanshou practitioners
French expatriate sportspeople in the United States
Sportspeople from Paris
French sportspeople of Senegalese descent
1983 births